Innisfallen is an island in Lough Leane, County Kerry, Ireland, which is the location of the ruins of a 7th century monastic abbey.

Innisfallen may also refer to:

 Innisfallen (ship), the name of several ships
 Innisfallen Castle and grounds, Castle Cove, City of Willoughby, New South Wales, Australia
 Innisfail, Queensland, originally called Innisfallen after the island in County Kerry

See also
 
 INIS (disambiguation)
 Innis (disambiguation)
 Fallen (disambiguation)
 Annals of Inisfallen, a chronicle of medieval Ireland